Boris Elkis (born in Moscow) is a Russian composer. He has studied at the Gnessins music academy.

Filmography 
A Perfect Getaway - original music
Street Kings - music programmer
Darfur Now - music programmer
Days of Wrath - music programmer
Awake - music programmer And Keyboards
The Condemned (2007) - music programmer
What About Your Friends: Weekend Getaway - additional music
Divided City - original music
The Godson - original music
Streetwise - original music
Bugged - original music
Æon Flux - music programmer
Call of Duty 2 (Video game) - music programmer
Call of Duty 2: The Big Red One (Video game) - music programmer
Harsh Times - music programmer
The Fog - music programmer
Walking Tall - music programmer
Freddy vs. Jason - music programmer
Cloud Seven - original music
Lost - additional music score
9-11: American Reflections - Film editing
The House 2 - original music

References

External links 
 
 List of soundtrack composers
 Interview with boris Elkis

Russian film score composers
Male film score composers
1973 births
Living people
Musicians from Moscow
Gnessin State Musical College alumni